Notes from the Past is the sixth studio album by Swedish progressive rock band Kaipa. It is also the band's first release in twenty years, this time with a renewed lineup and with the return of guitarist Roine Stolt.

Track listing
All songs by Hans Lundin except where noted.

Personnel
Hans Lundin - keyboards
Roine Stolt - guitars, vocals
Morgan Ågren - drums
Patrik Lundström - lead vocals
Jonas Reingold - bass guitar
Aleena Gibson - additional vocals
Tove Thörn Lundin - additional vocals

Notes 

2002 albums
Kaipa albums
Inside Out Music albums